The 2020–21 season is VfL Osnabrück's 122nd season in existence and the club's 2nd consecutive season in the second flight of German football. In addition to the domestic league, VfL Osnabrück will participate in this season's edition of the DFB-Pokal. The season covers the period from 1 July 2020 to 30 June 2021.

Transfers

Friendly matches

Competitions

Overview

2. Bundesliga

League table

Results summary

Results by round

Matches

Play-offs

DFB-Pokal

Notes

References

External links

VfL Osnabrück seasons
VfL Osnabrück